James Fox House is a historic home located at Italy in Yates County, New York. It is a Federal style structure built about 1815.

It was listed on the National Register of Historic Places in 1994.

References

Houses on the National Register of Historic Places in New York (state)
Federal architecture in New York (state)
Houses completed in 1815
Houses in Yates County, New York
National Register of Historic Places in Yates County, New York